The 2006 Commonwealth Games, officially the XVIII Commonwealth Games and commonly known as Melbourne 2006 (Boonwurrung/Woiwurrung: Narrm 2006 or Naarm 2006), was an international multi-sport event for members of the Commonwealth held in Melbourne, Australia between 15 and 26 March 2006. It was the fourth time Australia had hosted the Commonwealth Games. It was also the largest sporting event to be staged in Melbourne, eclipsing the 1956 Summer Olympics in terms of the number of teams competing, athletes competing, and events being held.

More than 4,000 athletes from 71 Commonwealth Games Associations took part in the event. Zimbabwe withdrew its membership from the Commonwealth of Nations and Commonwealth Games Federation on 8 December 2003 and so did not participate in the event. With 245 sets of medals, the games featured 17 Commonwealth sports. These sporting events took place at 13 venues in the host city, two venues in Bendigo and one venue each in Ballarat, Geelong, Lysterfield Park and Traralgon.

The site for the opening and closing ceremonies was the Melbourne Cricket Ground which was also used during 1956 Summer Olympics. The mascot for the games was Karak, a red-tailed black cockatoo (a threatened species). The official song of the games, "Together We Are One", was composed by the ARIA awardee Australian recording artist Delta Goodrem. During the closing ceremony of the games, President of the Commonwealth Games Federation Mike Fennell declared to the crowd "Melbourne, you are simply the best".

For the first time in the history of the Commonwealth Games, the Queen's Baton visited every single Commonwealth nation and territory taking part in the Games, a journey of 180,000 km (112,500 miles). The relay ended when the Governor of Victoria, and former Commonwealth Games medallist, John Landy delivered the baton to Her Majesty the Queen at the Melbourne Cricket Ground during the opening ceremony.

The host nation Australia topped the medal table for the fifth time in the past five Commonwealth Games, winning the most golds (84) and most medals overall (221). England and Canada finished second and third respectively.

The 2006 Commonwealth Games have been lauded as “best Commonwealth Games ever”. A KPMG analysis of Melbourne's 2006 Commonwealth Games found the event prompted an increase in Gross State Product of about $1.6bn over a 20-year period and employment of about 13,600 jobs.

Host selection

During the 1998 Commonwealth Games in Kuala Lumpur, Malaysia, two cities initially expressed interest in hosting the event; Melbourne, Australia and Wellington, New Zealand. Wellington withdrew its bid, citing the costs involved with matching the bid plan presented by Melbourne, which became the default host without members of the Federation going to vote.

Preparation and development

Venues 
The following venues were used at the 2006 Commonwealth Games. The sport(s) that were played at that venue are listed after it.

Melbourne venues

 Docklands Precinct: Walks and Marathon 
 Melbourne Cricket Ground: Opening and Closing Ceremonies, and Athletics (Track and Field)
 Melbourne Convention and Exhibition Centre: Badminton, Boxing and Weightlifting
 Melbourne Gun Club: Clay Target Shooting
 Melbourne International Shooting Club: Small Bore and Pistol Shooting
 Melbourne Sports and Aquatic Centre: Aquatics, Squash and Table tennis
Multi Purpose Venue (Melbourne Park): Basketball Finals, Track Cycling and Netball Finals
 Rod Laver Arena (Melbourne Park): Gymnastics
 Royal Botanic Gardens Circuit: Cycling Road Race events
 State Lawn Bowls Centre: Lawn Bowls
 State Netball and Hockey Centre: Netball preliminaries and Hockey
 St Kilda: Triathlon and Cycling Time Trial
 Docklands Stadium: Rugby 7s

Regional and suburban venues
 Ballarat Ballarat Minerdome: Basketball
 Bendigo Bendigo Stadium: BasketballWellsford Rifle Range: Full Bore Shooting
 GeelongGeelong Arena: Basketball
 Lysterfield Park State Mountain Bike Course: Mountain Bike Cycling
 Traralgon Traralgon Sports Stadium: Basketball

Cost 
Early concerns arose about the large cost of staging the Games, with projected costs likely to be over AUD 1 billion and a high likelihood the Victorian taxpayer would have to cover the expense. The cost was described in some local media as excessive. National Party leader Peter Ryan said that the Labor government should win "gold (medal) for burning money". However, not all of this money was wasted. The actual costs for hosting the games was AUD 1.144 billion and prior to the Games, accountants at KPMG were estimating that the gross income generated by this event could be as high as AUD 1.5 billion.

Development 
Melbourne's premier sporting ground, the Melbourne Cricket Ground (MCG), was redeveloped in preparation for the Games. An athlete's village in the inner suburb of Parkville housed approximately 7,000 athletes and support staff during the Games, and has been transformed into commercial housing with a distinctly eco-friendly image. The creation of this village attracted controversy, with critics claiming it was created by alienating public parkland, while proponents maintained that it represented the renewal of an otherwise derelict inner-city area.

The change from Daylight Saving Time to Standard Time in Australian states that follow it was delayed from 26 March to 2 April for 2006 to avoid affecting the games. In addition, state and private schools amended their usual term times so as to allow the first term holidays to coincide with the Games.

Melbourne's public transport system – train, tram and bus – ran to altered timetables with some amended or substituted services for the duration of the Games. For the most part, timetabled services were unchanged but suffered due to higher loads.

For the first time ever, the Melbourne 2006 Commonwealth Games appointed a Goodwill Partner, Plan International Australia.

Participating teams
There were 71 countries, territories and bodies competing at the 2006 Commonwealth Games. The only difference between the 2006 games and the 2002 games was the absence of Zimbabwe, which withdrew from the Commonwealth of Nations.

Calendar

Sports 

The 2006 Commonwealth Games included 17 sports, with 12 individual sports and 4 team sports. In total there are 245 events at the Games.

  Diving
  Swimming
  Synchronized swimming

  Road
  Track
  Mountain biking

  Artistic gymnastics
  Rhythmic gymnastics

The athletics, swimming, table tennis and weightlifting sports included fully integrated events for elite athletes with a disability (EAD). These events were included in the official medal tally.

Ceremonies

Opening ceremony

Both the Melbourne Cricket Ground and the Yarra River were centrepieces for the ceremony, which included many fireworks, and other spectacle. The Games were opened by Elizabeth II, in her capacity as Head of the Commonwealth. The Queen is also Head of State of a number of Commonwealth countries.

Closing ceremony 

Both the Melbourne Cricket Ground and the Yarra River were again centrepieces for the ceremony. Samresh Jung of India was given the David Dixon Award at the closing ceremony. He was the "Best Athlete of the 18th Commonwealth Games". The games were closed by The Earl of Wessex, Prince Edward.

Medal table

Broadcasting 

 The host broadcaster was Trans World International, while the domestic rights-holding broadcaster was the Nine Network in Australia. They showed rolling coverage, except for a break for the evening news and overnight.
 In Australia Fox Sports broadcast the Games on eight dedicated digital Pay-TV channels. These were available on the Foxtel, Austar and Optus Vision networks.
 The BBC covered the Commonwealth Games in the United Kingdom on BBC One and BBC Two. BBCi included a choice of two extra video streams on Freeview and four streams on Digital Satellite and Cable. Users with broadband in the United Kingdom could also view all 5 video streams on bbc.co.uk, and the BBC Sport website.
CBC, CBC Newsworld, and CBC Country Canada aired a daily one-hour highlights show of the Commonwealth Games in Canada. Compared to past games, the CBC's coverage was minimally staffed, with commentary from other broadcasting partners. At first, they did not even consider bidding for the broadcasting rights due to scheduling conflicts with events Canadians are more interested in, such as the Tim Hortons Brier, World Figure Skating Championships, and the 2006 Winter Paralympics (which itself had been reduced to five-to-ten-minute daily coverage). None of Canada's metropolitan newspapers sent any journalists to report on the Games, instead relying on news agencies
 TVNZ covered the games for the residents of New Zealand.
 In Malaysia, TV1 broadcast live coverage of the Games for three hours starting at 10 am Malaysian time and for two hours starting at 3 pm, with highlights at 12:30 am. Satellite provider Astro included three dedicated channels to broadcast the Games live to its Sports package subscribers, in addition to delayed broadcast 24 hours later.
 Singapore's MediaCorp TV had supposedly not broadcast the games due to the high cost of telecast rights, satellite charges and the lack of sponsors. However, on 17 March, the MediaCorp found other sponsors which is the Ministry of Community Development, Youth and Sports and the Singapore Sports Council. Broadcast started from 18 March until the end of the games. 
 In India, Prasar Bharati broadcast the games on DD National and DD Sports. All India Radio broadcast the running commentary of the main matches and events.
 In the United States, selected coverage was carried by Fox College Sports.
 In the Bahamas, Cable 12 on cable Bahamas broadcast the games.
 Altogether an estimated 4 billion viewers watched the 2006 Commonwealth Games worldwide.

Marketing

Logo 
The logo of the 2006 Commonwealth Games is an image of 2 figures, which represents sport and culture, achievement and excellence, while the colours green, yellow, and red represents celebratory, fresh and youthfully optimistic character of Melbourne city. The two figures in the logo joined to form a letter M, which is the initial letter of Melbourne, the games host city.

Mascot
Karak was the mascot for the 2006 Commonwealth Games. He was modelled on a red-tailed black cockatoo, a threatened species within the host country, Australia.

Sponsors

Official Partners

 National Australia Bank
 Visa Inc.
 Qantas
 Telstra
 Tabcorp Holdings
 Toyota
 Microsoft
 BHP

Official Sponsors

 Hudson
 MLC
 Holmesglen Institute of TAFE
 Konica Minolta
 Coates Hire
 Nestlé Peters
 PricewaterhouseCoopers
 Australia Post
 De Bortoli Wines
 Cadbury
 Woolworths Supermarkets
 Foster's Group
 Royal Automobile Club of Victoria
 Triple M
 Omega

Official Providers

 Allens
 TOWER Software
 Finsbury Green Printing
 AccorHotels
 Hard Yakka
 Royal Australian Mint 
 Tork
 Mistral
 DB Schenker
 Sleepmaker
 Dell Australia
 Australian Project & Consulting Services (APCS)
 Cleanevent
 Melbourne Docklands
 Ramler Furniture
 Rehame
 CityLink
 Interflora
 Rexona 
 City of Ballarat 
 HBA Health Insurance 
 Snowhite Cleaning Services 
 Y&J Timber Flooring 
 Bytecraft 
 Pico Moreton Consortium 
 Philips Medical Systems Australasia 
 Cisco 
 Waterfront City 
 Origin Energy
 Ticketmaster

Controversies

Missing athletes
On 20 March 2006 it was reported that two athletes had gone missing from the Commonwealth Games village: Tanzanian boxer Omari Idd Kimweri and Bangladeshi runner Mohammad Tawhidul Islam.

On 22 March 2006 it was reported that seven athletes from Sierra Leone (three women and four men) had also disappeared. A further seven Sierra Leonean athletes also went missing during the course of the Games, bringing the total runaway count to fourteen (two-thirds of the team). Victoria Police believed that they had fled to Sydney where the Sierra Leonean community is much larger than Melbourne's.

Two hours before the Closing Ceremony on 26 March, officials from the Cameroon team reported to police that nine of their members had also vanished.

These incidents were not without precedent: 27 athletes similarly disappeared from the 2002 Commonwealth Games in Manchester, England (21 from Sierra Leone, 5 from Bangladesh and one from Pakistan), and over 80 athletes and officials overstayed their visas after the 2000 Summer Olympics in Sydney.

On request of Sierra Leone officials, the Commonwealth Games Federation cancelled those athletes' Games accreditation, allowing the Australian Department of Immigration and Multicultural Affairs (DIMA) to cancel their visas at midnight on 27 March, and begin investigating their disappearance.
At 7.20 am on that day, New South Wales Police located six of the Sierra Leonean athletes in a house at Freshwater near Manly Beach in Sydney. All six indicated they wished to seek political asylum in Australia, and were granted bridging visas by DIMA while their refugee applications were arranged. The athletes claimed to have been subjected to violence and torture in their home country; seventeen-year-old Isha Conteh stated she could be forced into female genital cutting if she returned. On Tuesday 28 March, six further Sierra Leoneans turned themselves in to immigration authorities in Sydney and were also granted bridging visas.

Two of the missing Cameroonian athletes were later found in Perth, Western Australia.

The Stolenwealth Games 
The Stolenwealth Games were protests at the 1982 and 2006 Commonwealth Games. People were protesting because they believed that the Commonwealth Games lead to the erasure of indigenous people. There were also problems with land rights. These protests lead to the creation of the Global Indigenous Games.

See also 
 2005 Summer Deaflympics
 Festival Melbourne2006
 Commonwealth Games celebrated in Australia
 1938 Commonwealth Games – Sydney
 1962 Commonwealth Games – Perth
 1982 Commonwealth Games – Brisbane
 2018 Commonwealth Games – Gold Coast
 2026 Commonwealth Games (future) – scheduled to Victoria
 Commonwealth Youth Games celebrated in Australia
 2004 Commonwealth Youth Games – Bendigo
 Olympic Games celebrated in Australia
 1956 Summer Olympics – Melbourne
 2000 Summer Olympics – Sydney
 2032 Summer Olympics (future) – Brisbane
 Paralympic Games celebrated in Australia
 2000 Summer Paralympics – Sydney
 2032 Summer Paralympics (future) – Brisbane

References

External links

 "Melbourne 2006". Thecgf.com. Commonwealth Games Federation.
 "Results and Medalists—2006 Commonwealth Games". Thecgf.com. Commonwealth Games Federation.
 "Official Website". M2006.thecgf.com. Melbourne 2006.

 
Commonwealth Games in Australia
Sports competitions in Melbourne
Commonwealth Games
Commonwealth Games by year
Commonwealth Games
2000s in Melbourne
March 2006 sports events in Australia